The FA Women's National League, formerly WFA National League and FA Women's Premier League (WPL), is a group of six football divisions run by the English Football Association. Founded in 1991 by the Women's Football Association, the League included England's top division from 1991 to 2010.

The League now sits at step 3 and 4 of the women's football pyramid (below the FA Women's Super League and the Women's Championship).

The League's Premier Division/National Division contained England's top women's clubs from 1991–92 until the season 2009–10. During this time, Arsenal Ladies won 12 League titles.  Below the National Division was a Northern Division and Southern Division, whose teams could win promotion.

The WPL National Division became the country's level 2 division from 2010–11 to 2012–13 and ended in 2013, replaced at level 2 by FA WSL 2, later renamed the Championship. The Northern Division and Southern Division teams (continuing at level 3) have since played for promotion to this division instead.

The feeder divisions of the Combination Women's Football Leagues (1998–2014) became officially part of the WPL system in 2014 at level 4. From these four divisions (North, Midlands, South East and South West), clubs can win promotion to the level 3 National League North or National League South.

History

Before the National League, women's teams nationally had competed in the WFA Cup (Women's FA Cup) since 1970, and there were English regional leagues, but this was the first regular nationwide competition of its kind.

The Women's National League was inaugurated in the 1991–92 season by the Women's Football Association (WFA), with a monetary grant from the Sports Council. Eight teams played in the top flight in that year. From the League's foundation, it consisted of a national premier division and two lower divisions, the Northern and Southern Divisions, whose winners each season were promoted to the top flight. 

From 1991–92 until 2012–13, the national premier division was above the Northern and Southern Divisions. Since 1991–92, the Northern and Southern Divisions have run on an equal basis with promotion, and this continues today. The terms Women's Premiership and Ladies Premiership were generally used for the National Division only.

After the League's third season, the FA assumed responsibility for the competition and renamed it, beginning with the 1994–95 FA Women's Premier League (FA WPL).

The Women's Premier League remained level 1 and 2 of women's football until the end of the 2009–10 season. From 2000 until 2008, the WPL champions competed in the annual FA Women's Community Shield.

The National Division's most successful clubs were Arsenal (12 titles), Croydon (3 titles), Doncaster Belles (2 titles and 7 times runners-up), Everton (1 title and 5 times runners-up), and Sunderland (3 titles at league level 2).

The Women's Premier League lost several clubs prior to the 2010–11 season and the National Division was demoted to level 2, due to the creation of the FA WSL in 2011. (The WSL was a summer league for its first six years, as opposed to the WPL's winter format.) Strangely, the lower divisions were still given the name "Premier League" for eight more seasons. The number of clubs competing in the Northern and Southern Divisions decreased from 12 to 10. The National Division decreased from 12 clubs to eight (2010–11), then increased to 10 clubs (2011–12 and 2012–13).

After the WPL National Division's three seasons at level 2, that division was scrapped after 2012–13, due to the FA's decision to add another WSL division, WSL 2, for its 2014 season, which included some clubs that moved from the WPL. 

The only divisions in 2013–14 with WPL branding were the Northern and Southern Divisions at league level 3.

From the 2014–15 season, the Women's Premier League incorporated the four existing Combination Women's Football Leagues (level 4), as the Premier League's "Division One", with four groups of Division One leagues: North, Midlands, South East and South West. 

2014 saw a significant change with the operation of the league moving away from The FA with an independent Management Committee elected by the clubs to run league operations and administer the competition on their behalf.

The FA proposed rebranding the WPL collectively as the Women's Championship League, but instead the clubs elected to keep the name Women's Premier League until 2018, thereafter it became known as The FA Women’s National League - still an FA branded league but run independently from The FA.

The winners of the Northern and Southern Divisions have played each other since 2014–15 in a single play-off at a neutral venue, to win the Women's Premier League/National League championship and promotion into the level 2 division. This was the first instance of promotion from the WPL to the WSL when the first play-off occurred in 2015. In that year's play-off between Portsmouth and Sheffield F.C. at Stratford FC's ground, Sheffield won through a stoppage-time goal.

The six divisions were renamed the Women's National League from 2018–19.

National Division champions

Below is a list of women's Premier Division/National Division champions in its history from 1991–92 until 2012–13.

The League was run by the Women's Football Association in 1991–92 and 1992–93; by the Women's Football Alliance and an FA committee in 1993–94; and the FA renamed the League in 1994–95. (The Women's FA Cup was run by the WFA from 1970–71 to 1992–93, and taken over by the FA in 1993–94.)

Level 1 national champions

Level 2 national champions:

From 2014, the level 2 national division was FA WSL 2.

Northern/Southern Division champions

Level 2 champions:

Level 3 champions:

Automatic promotion ended in 2012–13. From 2014–15 onwards, the club marked in bold won the League championship play-off between the Northern and Southern Division winners, and won promotion to WSL 2/Women's Championship.

Division One champions
Following the incorporation of the Combination Women's Football Leagues into the Women's Premier League in 2014, the Women's Premier League/National League consisted of an additional four regional leagues below the Northern and Southern Divisions.

Level 4 champions:

Format and clubs

Currently there are 71 clubs in the League, with two tiers and six divisions: the Northern and Southern Premier Divisions (level 3 in the football pyramid), and the regional Division One North, Division One Midlands, Division One South East and Division One South West (all level 4).

These numbers have varied historically due to the changing structure of women's football.

Current teams

In the 2022–23 season, 27 teams compete in the Northern and Southern Premier Divisions (14 teams in the National Division South and 13 in the National Division North) and 47 teams compete in Division One (12 teams per division except for Division One South West which has 11 following the disbanding of Southampton Saints the previous season).

Premier Division

Northern
Boldmere St. Michaels
Brighouse Town
Burnley
Derby County
Fylde
Huddersfield Town
Liverpool Feds
Loughborough Foxes
Nottingham Forest
Stoke City
West Bromwich Albion
Wolverhampton Wanderers
Southern
Bridgwater United
Billericay Town
Cheltenham Town
Crawley Wasps
Gillingham
Ipswich Town
London Bees
MK Dons
Oxford United
Plymouth Argyle
Portsmouth
Watford

Division One

Division One North
Barnsley
Bradford City
Chorley
Durham Cestria
Hull City
Leeds United
Merseyrail
Middlesbrough
Newcastle United
Norton & Stockton Ancients
Stockport County
York City
Division One Midlands
Doncaster Rovers Belles
Leafield Athletic
Leek Town
Lincoln City
Long Eaton United
Northampton Town
Peterborough United
Sheffield
Solihull Moors
Sporting Khalsa
Stourbridge
Wem Town

Division One South East
Actonians
AFC Wimbledon
Ashford Town
Cambridge City
Cambridge United
Chesham United
Hashtag United
Hounslow
London Seaward
Norwich City
QPR
Wymondham Town
Division One South West
Bournemouth
Cardiff City
Chichester & Selsey
Exeter City
Keynsham Town
Larkhall Athletic
Maidenhead United
Moneyfields
Portishead Town
Southampton
St. Austell
Swindon Town

Cup competitions

The main cup competition of the National League is the FA Women's National League Cup, a knock-out competition involving all of the teams within the League's six divisions. Due to the changing structure of women's football, this competition has historically varied from a straight knock-out competition to a competition with a preliminary group stage before reaching the knock-out stage. The first Cup-winners were Arsenal in the 1991–92 WFA Women's National League Cup. The first winners of a Cup without top-flight teams were Barnet F.C. Ladies in the 2010–11 FA Women's Premier League Cup.

The FA Women's National League Plate was introduced in the 2014–15 season (as the Women's Premier League Plate). Under the current format, the teams that are eliminated from the opening round of the League Cup are entered into the Plate.

Sponsorship
The league's sponsors have included AXA (until 2004), Nationwide Building Society (2004–2007) and Tesco (2007–?).

See also
FA Women's Premier League National Division
FA Women's National League Cup

References

External links
The Football Association – Women's National League official site

 
2
Sports leagues established in 1991
1991 establishments in England

sv:FA Women's Premier League National Division